RC-30 or Sembiapalayam–Kizhur Road branches out from RC-19 at Sembiapalayam and ends at Kizhur.

It is passing through the following villages:
 Sathamangalam
 Sivaranthagam

References

External links
 Official website of Public Works Department, Puducherry UT

State highways in Puducherry
Transport in Puducherry